The Tragedy at Freyne is a 1927 mystery detective novel by Anthony Gilbert, the pen name of British writer Lucy Beatrice Malleson. Her first novel under the pseudonym, it introduced the amateur detective Scott Egerton who was her principle character until the creation of Arthur Crook in Murder by Experts.

Synopsis
Sir Simon Chandos is found dead in his library with a confession written in front of him and a bottle of morphia tablets by his side, it appears to an obvious case of suicide. However one of the guests at the country house notices a slight discrepancy and launches his own amateur investigation into the death.

References

Bibliography
 Magill, Frank Northen . Critical Survey of Mystery and Detective Fiction: Authors, Volume 2. Salem Press, 1988.
Murphy, Bruce F. The Encyclopedia of Murder and Mystery. Springer, 1999.
 Reilly, John M. Twentieth Century Crime & Mystery Writers. Springer, 2015.

1927 British novels
British mystery novels
British thriller novels
Novels by Anthony Gilbert
Novels set in England
British detective novels
William Collins, Sons books
Dial Press books